John IV, Count of Sponheim-Starkenburg (born before 1338; died 16 October 1413 or 12 April 1414) was a German nobleman. He ruled the county of Sponheim from 1398 until his death.

He married Elisabeth of Sponheim, daughter of Walram, Count of Sponheim-Kreuznach. 
They  had one son : John V, Count of Sponheim-Starkenburg (c. 1359 - 1437). 

House of Sponheim
1413 deaths
1414 deaths